Alexander Davitashvili (born 1 July 1974) is a Georgian judoka.

Achievements

References

1974 births
Living people
Male judoka from Georgia (country)
Judoka at the 2000 Summer Olympics
Olympic judoka of Georgia (country)